South Face may refer to:
 South Face (Charlotte Dome)
 South Face (Petit Grepon)